The Festival of World Cups is a collection of Rugby League World Cups usually held as a support series alongside the centrepiece Men's, Women's, and Wheelchair tournaments. First held in 2008, the festival includes events such as police, armed forces, student, masters, and physical disability teams.

2008 Festival of World Cups
2013 Festival of World Cups
2017 Festival of World Cups
2021 Festival of World Cups
2025 Festival of World Cups

Rugby League World Cup
Recurring sporting events established in 2008